The Mongolian Air Force is the aerial warfare service branch of the Mongolian Armed Forces.

History

Early years and WWII 
On 25 May 1925, a Junkers F.13 piloted by Lieutenant Colonel D. Shatarragchaa entered service as the first aircraft in Mongolian civil and military aviation, landing in Mongolia that day. By 1935 Soviet aircraft were based in the country. In May 1937 the air force was renamed the Mongolian People's Republic Air Corps. During 1939–1945 the Soviets delivered Polikarpov I-15s, Polikarpov I-16s, Yak-9s and Ilyushin Il-2s.

Cold War 

By 1966 the first S-75 Dvina SAM units entered service, and the air force was renamed the Air Force of the Mongolian People's Republic. The MiG-15UTI and MiG-17 the first combat jet aircraft in the Mongolian inventory, entered service in 1970 and by the mid-1970s was joined by 25 MiG-21s, Mi-8s and Ka-26s. Jügderdemidiin Gürragchaa, the first Mongolian to fly into space, was born on 5 December 1947, in the Gurvan-Bulak settlement of Bulgan Province, into the family of a cattle-breeder. He graduated from a military school of aircraft technicians in the Soviet Union. In 1972 he was enrolled at the Zhukovsky Air Force Academy. After graduating from the academy, he worked as an aircraft equipment engineer in an air squadron of the Mongolian People's Army. In 1978, Jugderdemidiyn Gurragchaa started training at Gagarin cosmonauts' training center and completed a course of training under the Intercosmos program. His flight with Vladimir Dzhanibekov on Soyuz 39 as a Research Cosmonaut, launched 22 March 1981, lasted 7 days, 20 hours, 42 minutes, 3 seconds. He was later became the head of a scientific institute in Ulan Bator and eventually Mongolian Minister of Defence.

The Civil Air Transport Administration, responsible for Mongolian Airlines (MIAT), was thought to be affiliated with the air force. All airline pilots had military ranks, and they flew Soviet-built transport aircraft on crop dusting, forest and steppe fire patrol, and air ambulance missions. During the mid-1960s the USSR assisted the People's Republic of Mongolia in setting up an air defense system, which also was closely coordinated with the Soviet Air Defence Forces.

Since 1989 
After the end of the Cold War and the advent of the Democratic Revolution, the air force was effectively grounded due to a lack of fuel and spare parts. Due to a complete lack of resources, as of 2006 Mongolia did not anticipate being able to reform its flying Air Force in the foreseeable future. However, as air defense is part of the Air Force, the US was pursuing specific training line items in this field as well as air-related fields that may support peacekeeping deployments and operations (For example, slots to the United States Army Air Defense Artillery Branch officer basic course, tarmac security, and cargo load planning).

Modern air force 
The government has been trying to revive the air force since 2001. The current Armed Forces maintains an Air Forces Defense Command (Агаарын довтолгооноос хамгаалах цэргийн командлал), under the command of the General Staff. The country has the goal of developing a full air force in the future.

Units 

 Unit 303
 Unit 337

Equipment 
Russia's 2008 decision to provide to Mongolia around $120 million worth of conventional weapons and other military equipment, including MI-24 attack helicopters and possibly two MiG-29 fighter jets, has drawn renewed attention to the bilateral relationship. Although the terms of the deal were not initially clear, it would be a combination of grant aid and low-interest loans.

In 2011, the Ministry of Defense announced that they would buy MiG-29s from Russia by the end of the year, but this did not materialize. From 2007 – 2011 the fleet of MiG-21s was reduced.

In October 2012 the Ministry of Defense returned an Airbus A310-300 to MIAT Mongolian Airlines. In 2013 the Air Force looked at buying three Lockheed Martin C-130J planes,  however a deal was never reached. Left without Russian aid, the Mongolian air force's inventory has gradually been reduced to a few Antonov An-24/26'st and a dozen airworthy Mi-24 and Mi-8 helicopters.

On 26 November 2019 Russia donated two MiG-29 fighter aircraft to Mongolia.

Aircraft

Air Defense

References

 
Mongolia
Air Force
Military aviation in Asia